Laze pri Gorenjem Jezeru is a small settlement next to Gorenje Jezero on the southern edge of Lake Cerknica in the Municipality of Cerknica in the Inner Carniola region of Slovenia.

Name
The name of the settlement was changed from Laze to Laze pri Gorenjem Jezeru in 1953.

Church
The local church west of the settlement is dedicated to Saint Bricius and belongs to the Parish of Stari Trg pri Ložu.

References

External links

Laze pri Gorenjem Jezeru on Geopedia

Populated places in the Municipality of Cerknica